Kevin Joseph Kent (born 19 March 1965) is an English former professional football player and coach.

Starting his career as a winger at West Bromwich Albion in 1983, he began playing regular football with Newport County the following year. He then made his name playing for Mansfield Town over a six-year period from 1985 to 1991. He then transferred to Port Vale, where he finished his career following a five-year spell. Over a thirteen-year professional career he played 454 games, scoring 57 goals (claiming 45 goals in 379 appearances in the Football League). He won the Football League Trophy both with Mansfield (1987) and Port Vale (1993), and helped the "Stags" to win promotion out of the Fourth Division (1985–86) and the "Valiants" to win promotion out of the Second Division (1993–94).

Playing career
Kent began his career at West Bromwich Albion, and made two First Division appearances under Ron Wylie and Johnny Giles in the 1983–84 campaign. He then left The Hawthorns and signed for Newport County of the Third Division. He played 33 league games for Colin Addison's "Exiles" in 1984–85, before leaving Rodney Parade to join Mansfield Town. He helped Ian Greaves's side to win promotion out of the Fourth Division with a third-place finish in 1985–86. In 1986–87 he scored ten goals in 57 games, and wrote his name in the club's history books on 24 May 1987, when he became the first (and to date, the only) player in Mansfield's history to score at Wembley when the "Stags" won the Football League Trophy after beating Bristol City on penalties following a 1–1 draw (he also successfully converted his penalty). He scored fifteen goals in 58 games in the 1987–88 campaign. Mansfield posted a 15th-place finish in 1988–89, before new boss George Foster led the club to another 15th-place finish in 1989–90. They were demoted back into the basement division after a last place finish in 1990–91. In total, Kent played 276 first-team games and scored 47 goals in his six seasons at Field Mill.

In March 1991, Kent joined Port Vale in exchange for Gary Ford and £80,000. He featured in 11 Second Division games at the end of the 1990–91 season, but featured just 25 times in the 1991–92 campaign, as the "Valiants" suffered relegation with a last place finish. He played 28 Third Division (renamed the Second Division due to the creation of the Premier League) games in the 1992–93 season; he did though play 40 games in total throughout the campaign, as he helped the Vale to win the TNT Tournament, the Football League Trophy, and to reach the play-off final. They beat Stockport County in the Football League Trophy Final, but lost 3–0 to West Bromwich Albion in the play-off final. Manager John Rudge ensured his side made up for their failure to win the play-offs by leading them to promotion as the division's runners-up in 1993–94. However, injuries soon brought Kent's career to a halt; he fractured his hand in October 1994 and his kneecap the following February and was hospitalised in May 1995 with a back injury; this final injury brought about his early retirement at the end of the 1995–96 season. On his retirement he became a coaching assistant at Vale Park.

Coaching career
Whilst at his final club, Port Vale, Kent began working as a coach at the club's Centre of Excellence from 1993 to 1996 and 2004 to 2006 under Mark Grew, Brian Horton and Martin Foyle. Before this he gained experience at Mansfield Town's Centre of Excellence under Ian Greaves. From 2005 to 2007 he worked at Stoke City's academy, before beginning a short coaching stint at Manchester United after obtaining his UEFA A Licence. Between 2009 and 2011 he worked as the Indonesian Football Association's National Academy Director. He also worked as a manager at Barclays Bank Sports Facilities and Events department between 1997 and 2009.

Career statistics
Source:

A.  The "Other" column constitutes appearances and goals in the League Cup, Football League Trophy, Football League play-offs and Full Members Cup.

Honours
Mansfield Town
Associate Members' Cup: 1987

Port Vale
Football League Trophy: 1993

References

1965 births
Living people
Footballers from Stoke-on-Trent
English footballers
Association football wingers
West Bromwich Albion F.C. players
Newport County A.F.C. players
Mansfield Town F.C. players
Port Vale F.C. players
English Football League players
Association football coaches
Port Vale F.C. non-playing staff
Stoke City F.C. non-playing staff
Manchester United F.C. non-playing staff